The hairy fruit-eating bat (Artibeus hirsutus) is a species of bat in the family Phyllostomidae. It is endemic to Mexico.

Sources

Artibeus
Bats of Mexico
Endemic mammals of Mexico
Mammals described in 1906
Taxa named by Knud Andersen
Taxonomy articles created by Polbot